The Greek reality show version of Dancing with the stars returned for its fourth season on October 20, 2013 from ANT1 TV channel. The show is based on the United Kingdom BBC Television series Strictly Come Dancing and is part of BBC Worldwide's Dancing with the Stars franchise. The theme song is "It's personal" performed by Swedish indie pop band The Radio Dept.

The host of this season was Doukissa Nomikou while on the backstage was the season three winner, Ntoretta Papadimitriou.

Giannis Latsios, Alexis Kostalas, Galena Velikova and Katia Dandoulaki returned as the judges of the show.

Of the celebrities that competed, 8 were female and 6 were male. The competitors were as follows: Chrispa, Katerina Stikoudi, Klelia Pantazi, Konstantina, Mary Synatsaki, Gogo Mastrokosta, Evagelia Aravani, Eleni Chatzidou, Lakis Gavalas, Michalis Mouroutsos, Thanos Kallioras, Sakis Arseniou, Isaias Matiamba and Alex Kavdas. Their professional partners were revealed on October 17, 2013.

On November 16, 2013, it was announced that on week 4, Giorgos Liagkas would make a guest appearance on the show and would be the fifth judge for the night. On week 8 Eugenia Manolidou, who competed in the first season of the show and got third place, was the second guest judge of the season. On week 9 the show had its third guest judge, Themos Anastasiadis. The three guests gave a score to the contestants but their score was symbolic and didn't count for the final result of that week.

On week 7, the couples were free to choose a favorite song of theirs to dance to and the routine was Freestyle.

At the end of the show of week 12, it was announced to the couples that they were going to dance to a trio challenge for their second dance the upcoming week. The third partner would be one of the previous stars of the season who got eliminated or a star from previous seasons of the show. From season 4, Aravani and Kavdas came back, while Elias Vrettos and Laura Narjes from season 3 also came back to dance with two of the couples. Vrettos and Narjes finished on second and third place of season 3 respectively.

On week 14, the stars for their second dance were challenged to dance a solo whole choreography without their pro partners.

This season lasted for 15 weeks due to one week with no elimination. It's the first season to last that long. For the final week, the audience was able to vote during the whole week and the winner was decided only by the public vote. Judges' scores did not count for the final result.

Judges
Alexis Kostalas, announcer, sports commentator
Galena Velikova, choreographer, dancer, dance teacher. Galena has also been a judge at Dancing Stars, the Bulgarian version of the show, for seasons 1&3.
Giannis Latsios, ANT1 television program manager
Katia Dandoulaki, actress

Couples

Scoring chart

Red numbers indicate the lowest score for each week
Green numbers indicate the highest score for each week
 the couple got the lowest score of the night and was eliminated that week
 the couple eliminated that week
 the returning couple finishing in the bottom two
 the winning couple
 the runner-up couple
 the third-place couple

Average score chart 
This table only counts for dances scored on a traditional 40-points scale. The points of Giorgos Liagkas in week 4 and Eugenia Manolidou's in week 8 are not included. Also, the extra five points Klelia won on the Christmas Rock n Roll Marathon are not included.

Highest and lowest scoring performances

Couples' highest and lowest scoring dances

According to the traditional 40-point scale:

Weekly scores
Unless indicated otherwise, individual judges scores in the charts below (given in parentheses) are listed in this order from left to right: Alexis Kostalas, Galena Velikova, Giannis Latsios and Katia Dandoulaki.

Week 1  

Running order

Week 2  

Running order

Week 3  

Running order

Week 4: Greek night 

This week the show had Giorgos Liagkas as a guest judge. Nomikou announced during the live show that Liagkas' score would be symbolic and it won't count for the final result of this week's elimination.

Blue numbers indicate Liagkas' score.

Running order

Week 5 

Running order

Week 6 

Running order

Week 7: Favorite song 
 Chrispa's partner, Vaggelis, couldn't be on the show for personal reasons this week and Thodoris stepped in for him.
Running order

Week 8: Dance Fusion Week 

This week the show had Eugenia Manolidou as a guest judge. Nomikou announced during the live show that Manolidou's score would be symbolic and it won't count for the final result of this week's elimination.

Blue numbers indicate Manolidou's score.
Running order

Week 9: Christmas show 
This week the show had Themos Anastasiadis as a guest judge but Anastasiadis didn't give score for the couples.
All the couples competed in a Christmas Rock n Roll Marathon. The winner couple took 5 extra points from the judges while the rest couples didn't get scored.

Running order

Week 10: Team dances
 This week the couple with the highest combined score from judges and viewers got immunity and was safe for next week.
 There was no elimination this week.

Running order

Week 11: 24-hour challenge 

Nomikou announced during the live show that Klelia, who won the immunity the previous week, was not going to get scored for her dance and that she was excluded from the 24-hour challenge.

Running order

Week 12: Solo night 

Running order

Week 13: Trio challenge 

For the trio challenge the couples were partnered with a previous star of the current season or a previous season. The couples chose their third partner by drawing envelopes at the end of the show of week 12. Stikoudi & Pantazi danced with Aravani & Kavdas (season 4) respectively and Matiamba & Synatsaki danced with Laura Narjes & Elias Vrettos (season 3) respectively.

Running order

Week 14: Semi-finals (Solo dance) 

Running order

Week 15: Finals  

Running order

Dance chart 

 Week 1: Cha-cha-cha for women and Tango for men.
 Week 2: Viennese Waltz for women and Jive for men.
 Week 3: Samba for women and Paso Doble for men.
 Week 4: Freestyle (Greek night)
 Week 5: Rumba for women and Bachata for men.
 Week 6: Argentine tango for women and Mambo for men.
 Week 7: Freestyle (Favorite song)
 Week 8: Dance fusion
 Week 9: Freestyle & Christmas Rock n Roll Marathon (Christmas show)
 Week 10: Salsa for women and Quickstep for men & Team dances
 Week 11: Freestyle & 24-hour challenge
 Week 12: Foxtrot & Cha-Cha-Cha (solo) for women and Cha-Cha-Cha & Jive (solo) for men
 Week 13: Quickstep for women and Waltz for men & Trio Challenge
 Week 14: Paso Doble for women and Foxtrot for men & Solo Dance Challenge
 Week 15: Favorite ballroom, one "new" latin & a face-off dance

 Highest scoring dance
 Lowest scoring dance
 Danced, but not scored
 Gained bonus points for this dance
 Highest score of the week and won immunity for next week

Guest performances 

Notes
 a.  The songs were playback
 b.  All songs were in the Greek versions of the Musical
 c.  The song was in the Greek version of the Musical

Ratings

References

External links
Official website of Dancing with the Stars Greece

Season 04
2013 Greek television seasons
2014 Greek television seasons